There are several political parties called Liberal Progressive Party:
 Liberal Progressive Party (Costa Rica, 1889)
 Liberal Progressive Party (Costa Rica, 2016)
 Liberal Progressive Party (Eritrea)
 Liberal Progressive Party (Spain)